An exclusive economic zone (EEZ), as prescribed by the 1982 United Nations Convention on the Law of the Sea, is an area of the sea in which a sovereign state has special rights regarding the exploration and use of marine resources, including energy production from water and wind. It stretches from the outer limit of the territorial sea (12 nautical miles from the baseline) out to 200 nautical miles (nmi) from the coast of the state in question. It is also referred to as a maritime continental margin and, in colloquial usage, may include the continental shelf. The term does not include either the territorial sea or the continental shelf beyond the 200 nautical mile limit. The difference between the territorial sea and the exclusive economic zone is that the first confers full sovereignty over the waters, whereas the second is merely a "sovereign right" which refers to the coastal state's rights below the surface of the sea. The surface waters are international waters.

Definition

Generally, a state's exclusive economic zone is an area beyond and adjacent to the territorial sea, extending seaward to a distance of no more than  out from its coastal baseline. When an overlap occurs, it is up to the states to delineate the actual maritime boundary. Generally, any point within an overlapping area defaults to the nearest state.

Thus, the exclusive economic zones includes the contiguous zone. The legal definition of the continental shelf does not directly correspond to the geological meaning of the term, as it also includes the continental rise and slope, and the entire seabed within the exclusive economic zone.

Origin and history
The idea of allotting nations EEZs to give them more control of maritime affairs outside territorial limits gained acceptance in the late 20th century.

Initially, a country's sovereign territorial waters extended  (range of cannon shot) beyond the shore. In modern times, a country's sovereign territorial waters extend to  beyond the shore. One of the first assertions of exclusive jurisdiction beyond the traditional territorial seas was made by the United States in the Truman Proclamation of 28 September 1945. However, it was Chile and Peru respectively that first claimed maritime zones of 200 nautical miles with the Presidential Declaration Concerning Continental Shelf of 23 June 1947 (El Mercurio, Santiago de Chile, 29 June 1947) and Presidential Decree No. 781 of 1 August 1947 (El Peruano: Diario . Vol. 107, No. 1983, 11 August 1947).

It was not until 1982 with the UN Convention on the Law of the Sea that the 200 nautical mile exclusive economic zone was formally adopted.

Disputes

The exact extent of exclusive economic zones is a common source of conflicts between states over marine waters.

 The South China Sea is the setting for several ongoing disputes between regional powers including China, Taiwan, Vietnam, the Philippines, Indonesia, and Malaysia.
 Croatia's ZERP (Ecological and Fisheries Protection Zone) in the Adriatic Sea caused friction with Italy and Slovenia, and caused problems during the accession of Croatia to the European Union.
 A wedge-shaped section of the Beaufort Sea is disputed between Canada and the United States, as the area reportedly contains substantial oil reserves.
 Mauritius claims an EEZ for Tromelin Island from France and an EEZ in respect of the British Indian Ocean Territory from the UK. An Exclusive Economic Zone covering 2.3 million square kilometres is claimed by Mauritius.
 Turkey claims a portion of Cyprus's claimed EEZ based on Turkey's definition that no islands, including Cyprus, can have a full EEZ and should only be entitled to 12 nautical miles. Furthermore, the internationally unrecognized Turkish Republic of Northern Cyprus (TRNC) also claims portions of Cyprus's claimed EEZ. Cyprus, intergovernmental organizations and other territories, such as the European Union, United States, Russia, Israel, Switzerland, Egypt, Saudi Arabia do not acknowledge the Turkish claims on Cyprus's land and claimed sea, and urge Turkey to restrain itself from "illegal" drilling for gas in the island's claimed EEZ. The EU has threatened Turkey with economic and political sanctions for violating Cyprus's claimed EEZ.
Greece claims a continental shelf and EEZ for all of its islands in the Aegean Sea (including Kastellorizo that has 11.98 km2 surface area) but Turkey refuses to recognize this, arguing that this claim is in violation of the principle of fairness of international law.
Greece claims that the maritime deal between internationally recognized GNA government of Libya and Turkey is illegal and it signed a counter agreement with Egypt.
 Lebanon claims that the agreement between Cyprus and Israel overlapped its own EEZ.
 Japan claims an EEZ around Okinotorishima, but this is disputed by China, Taiwan, and South Korea, who claim it is an islet which is incapable of generating an EEZ.

Potential disputes
Regions where a permanent ice shelf extends beyond the coastline are also a source of potential dispute.

Resolved disputes
 The Cod Wars between the United Kingdom and Iceland occurred periodically over many decades, until they were resolved with a final agreement in 1976.
 In 1992, the Canada–France Maritime Boundary Case, which centred on the EEZ around the French islands of Saint Pierre and Miquelon, was decided by an arbitral tribunal which concurred on the whole with the arguments put forth by Canada. France was awarded 18% of the area it had originally claimed.
 In 1999, following the Hanish Islands conflict, the Permanent Court of Arbitration ruled that the EEZs of Yemen and Eritrea should be demarcated equidistantly between the mainlands of the two nations, without taking account of sovereignty over the islands.
 In 2009, in a dispute between Romania and Ukraine over Snake Island, the UN International Court of Justice decided that Snake Island has no EEZ beyond 12 nautical miles of its own land.
 In 2010 the Norway and Russia dispute of both territorial sea and EEZ with regard to the Svalbard archipelago as it affects Russia's EEZ due to its unique treaty status was resolved. A treaty was agreed in principle in April 2010 between the two states and subsequently officially ratified, resolving this demarcation dispute. The agreement was signed in Murmansk on 15 September 2010.
 In 2014, the Netherlands and Germany resolved an old border dispute regarding the exact location of the border in the Dollart Bay.

Transboundary stocks

 
Fisheries management, usually adhering to guidelines set by the Food and Agriculture Organization (FAO), provides significant practical mechanisms for the control of EEZs. Transboundary fish stocks are an important concept in this control.
Transboundary stocks are fish stocks that range in the EEZs of at least two countries. Straddling stocks, on the other hand, range both within an EEZ as well as in the high seas, outside any EEZ. A stock can be both transboundary and straddling.

By country

Various island countries

Algeria
Algeria on 17 April 2018 established an exclusive economic zone (EEZ) off its coasts by Presidential Decree No. 18-96 of 2 Rajab 1439 corresponding to 20 March 2018. The permanent mission of Spain to the United Nations on 27 July 2018 declared its disagreement with the EEZ announced by Algeria and that the government of Spain indicated its willingness to enter into negotiations with the government of Algeria with a view to reaching a mutually acceptable agreement on the outer limits of their respective exclusive economic zones, The same was done by the Italian mission on 28 November 2018. The two countries indicated that the Algerian measure had been taken unilaterally and without consulting them.

On 25 November 2018, the Algerian Ministry of Foreign Affairs sent an oral note in response to the Spanish protest, explaining that the Algerian government does not recognize the largely exorbitant coordinates contained in Royal Decree 236/2013, which overlap with the coordinates of Presidential Decree n° 18–96 establishing an exclusive economic zone off the coast of Algeria. The Algerian government wished to emphasize that the unilateral delimitation carried out by Spain is not in conformity with the letter of the United Nations Convention on the Law of the Sea and has not taken into consideration the configuration, the specific characteristics and the special circumstances of the Mediterranean Sea, in particular for the case of the two countries whose coasts are located face to face, as well as the objective rules and relevant principles of international law to govern the equitable delimitation of the maritime areas between Algeria and Spain, in accordance with article 74 of the United Nations Convention on the Law of the Sea. Algeria expressed its willingness to negotiate for a just solution.

On 20 June 2019 a communication from Algeria was sent. It was addressed to the Italian embassy and the Spanish embassy in Algiers to show their eligibility in Algeria's exclusive economic zone.

Argentina

Considering the maritime areas claimed, the total area of Argentina reaches 3,849,756 km2. The recognized Argentine EEZ area is 1,159,063 km2.

Australia

To the 12 nautical miles boundary is Australia's territorial waters. Australia has the third largest exclusive economic zone, behind France and the United States, but ahead of Russia, with the total area of 8,148,250 square kilometres, which actually exceeds its land territory.

The United Nations Commission on the Limits of the Continental Shelf (CLCS) confirmed, in April 2008, Australia's rights over an additional 2.5 million square kilometres of seabed beyond the limits of Australia's EEZ. Australia also claimed, in its submission to the UN Commission on the Limits of the Continental Shelf, additional Continental Shelf past its EEZ from the Australian Antarctic Territory, but these claims were deferred on Australia's request. However, Australia's EEZ from its Antarctic Territory is approximately 2 million square kilometres.

Brazil

Brazil's EEZ includes areas around the Fernando de Noronha Islands, Saint Peter and Saint Paul Archipelago, and the Trindade and Martim Vaz Islands. It is called the Blue Amazon.

In 2004, Brazil submitted its claims to the United Nations Commission on the Limits of the Continental Shelf (CLCS) to extend its maritime continental margin.

Canada

Canada is unusual in that its exclusive economic zone, covering , is slightly smaller than its territorial waters.

Chile

Chile's EEZ includes areas around the Desventuradas Islands, Easter Island, and the Juan Fernández Islands.

In 2020 and 2022, Chile submitted its partial claims to the United Nations Commission on the Limits of the Continental Shelf (CLCS) to extend its maritime continental margin.

China

The first figure excludes all disputed waters, while the last figure indicates China's claimed boundaries, and does not take into account adjacent powers' claims.

Croatia

Croatia proclaimed Ecological and Fisheries Protection Zone in 2003, but it was not enforced toward other European Union states especially Italy and Slovenia. The zone was upgraded to EEZ in 2021 together with Italy and Slovenia. Territorial waters has 18,981 km2, while internal waters located within the baseline cover an additional 12,498 km2, and EEZ covers 24,482km2 for a total of 55,961km2.

Cyprus 
 
Cyprus EEZ covers 98,707 square km (38,100 square miles). Cyprus' EEZ borders those of Greece, Turkey, Syria, Lebanon, Israel and Egypt.

Denmark

The Kingdom of Denmark includes the constituent country (selvstyre) of Greenland and the constituent country (hjemmestyre) of the Faroe Islands.

Ecuador

Area: 1,077,231 km2

France

Due to its numerous overseas departments and territories scattered on all oceans of the planet, France possesses the largest EEZ in the world, covering 11.7 million km2. The EEZ of France covers approximately 8% of the total surface of all the EEZs of the world, whereas the land area of the French Republic is only 0.45% of the total land area of Earth.

Germany

The Federal Republic of Germany declared the entry into force of the convention with effect from 1 January 1995, the establishment of a German Exclusive Economic Zone in the North and Baltic Seas. The relevant German legal provisions that are applicable within the exclusive economic zone include the Maritime Task Act (Seeaufgabengesetz) from 1965, the Maritime Facilities Act (Seeanlagengesetz) from 2017, before that the Sea Facilities Ordinance (Seeanlagenverordnung) since 1997, the Federal Mining Act (Bundesberggesetz) and the Regional Planning Act (Raumordnungsgesetz).

The German EEZ has an area of 32,982 km². 70% of the EEZ is the entire German North Sea area and about 29% is the entire German Baltic Sea area.

Greece

Greece forms the southernmost part of the Balkan peninsula in the Mediterranean Sea. It includes many small islands which vary between 1,200 and 6,000 in the Aegean Sea and the Ionian Sea. The largest islands are Crete, Euboea, Lesbos, Rhodes and Chios.

Greece's EEZ is bordered to the west by Albania and Italy, to the south by Libya and Egypt, and to the east by Cyprus and Turkey.

India

India is currently seeking to extend its EEZ to 350 miles.

Indonesia

Indonesia has the 6th largest exclusive economic zone in the world. It claims an EEZ of 200 nautical miles (370 km) from its shores. This is due to the 13,466 islands of the Indonesian Archipelago. It has the 2nd largest coastline of 54,720 km (34,000 mi). The five main islands are: Sumatra, Java, Borneo, Sulawesi, and Western New Guinea. There are two major island groups (Nusa Tenggara and the Maluku Islands) and sixty smaller island groups.

Ireland

The Irish Exclusive Economic Zone was announced to be the location of a Russian military exercise in January 2022. The exercise was then moved outside the economic zone.

Israel
In 2010, an agreement was signed with Cyprus concerning the limit of territorial waters between Israel and Cyprus at the maritime halfway point, a clarification essential for safeguarding Israel's rights to oil and underwater gas reservoirs. The agreement was signed in Nicosia by Israeli Infrastructure Minister Uzi Landau and the Cypriot Foreign Minister Markos Kyprianou. The two countries agreed to cooperate in the development of any cross border resources discovered, and to negotiate an agreement on dividing joint resources.

Italy

Its EEZ is limited by maritime boundaries with neighboring countries to the north-west, east and southeast.

Italy's western sea territory stretches from the west coast of Italy in the Tyrrhenian Sea including the island Sardinia. The island Sicily is in the southernmost area. Lampedusa is Italy's southernmost point. It shares treaty-defined maritime boundaries with France, Spain, Algeria, Tunisia, Libya, Malta, Greece, Albania, Montenegro, Croatia and Slovenia.

Japan

It claims an EEZ of 200 nautical miles (370 km) from its shores.

Japan has disputes over its EEZ boundaries with all its Asian neighbors (China, Russia, South Korea, and Taiwan). The above, and relevant maps at the Sea Around Us Project both indicate Japan's claimed boundaries, and do not take into account the claims of adjacent jurisdictions.

Japan also refers to various categories of "shipping area" – Smooth Water Area, Coasting Area, Major or Greater Coasting Area, Ocean Going Area – but it is unclear whether these are intended to have any territorial or economic implications.

Malaysia

Mexico

Mexico's exclusive economic zones cover a total surface area of 3,144,295 km2, and places Mexico among the countries with the largest areas in the world. This puts Mexico's total territory as 5,153,735 km2.

New Zealand

Sources vary significantly on the size of New Zealand's EEZ; for example, a recent government publication gave the area as roughly 4,300,000 km2. These figures are for the EEZ of New Zealand proper, and do not include the EEZs of other territories in the Realm of New Zealand (the Cook Islands, Niue, Tokelau, and the Ross Dependency).

North Korea

The exclusive economic zone of North Korea stretches 200 nautical miles from its basepoints in both the West Sea (Yellow Sea) and the Sea of Japan. The EEZ was declared in 1977 after North Korea had contested the validity of the Northern Limit Lines (NLL) set up after the Korean War as maritime borders. The EEZ has not been codified in law and North Korea has never specified its coordinates, making it difficult to determine its specific scope.

In the West Sea, the EEZ remains unspecified in the Korea Bay because China has not determined its own EEZ in the area. The border between the North Korean and South Korean EEZs in the West Sea cannot be determined because of potential overlap and disputes over certain islands.

In the Sea of Japan, the North Korean EEZ can be approximated to be trapezoidal-shaped. The border between North Korea and Russia's respective EEZs is the only such border that has been determined in East Asia. Here, the EEZ does not cause many problems, even with regards to South Korea, because the sea is not thought to be rich in resources.

Norway

Norway has a large exclusive economic zone of 819,620 km2 around its coast. The country has a fishing zone of 1,878,953 km2, including fishing zones around Svalbard and Jan Mayen.

In April 2009, the United Nations Commission for the Limits of the Continental Shelf approved Norway's claim to an additional 235,000 square kilometres of continental shelf. The commission found that Norway and Russia both had valid claims over a portion of shelf in the Barents Sea.

Pakistan

Area: 290,000 km2

Pakistan coast is a 1046 km long coast, extending from sir creek in the east to Gwadar bay in the west ane the EEZ extends up to 290,000sqkm whick is more than 30% of its land area and ranks sixty sixth in the world by area.

Pakistan had an EEZ of 240,000 sqkm before their case was accepted by UNCLCS. Pakistan Navy with the help of National Oceanographic Organization(NIO) initiated the continental shelf case at ministerial level in 1995.

On 26 Aug 2013, a seven-member sub commission with members from Japan, China, Mozambique, Kenya, Demark, Georgia and Argentina was formulated at UNCLCS to evaluate technical details of Pakistan case and after a year accepted Pakistan's claim.

On 13 March 2015, UN Commission on the Limits of Continental Shelf (UNCLCS) accepted recommendations for extension of the outer limits of the continental shelf on Pakistan's case so far 80 countries had submitted claims to UNCLCS out of which recommendations of 22 countries including Pakistan had been finalised.

It was a historic event in the country's history when Pakistan became the first country in the region to have its continental shelf extended to 350 nm.

Some of the claimed territory overlapped Omani claim. It is believed that the verdict in favour of Pakistan was announced after successful negotiation with Oman.

Peru

Area: 906,454 km2

Philippines

Poland

The Polish EEZ covers the area of  within the Baltic Sea.

Portugal

Portugal has the 20th largest EEZ in the world. Presently, it is divided in three non-contiguous sub-zones:
 Continental Portugal 327,667 km2
 Azores 953,633 km2
 Madeira 446,108 km2
 Total : 1,727,408 km2
Portugal submitted a claim to extend its jurisdiction over an additional 2.15 million square kilometres of the adjacent continental shelf in May 2009, resulting in an area with a total of more than 3,877,408 km2. The submission, as well as a detailed map, can be found in the Task Group for the extension of the Continental Shelf website.

Spain formerly objected to the EEZ's southern border, maintaining that it should be drawn halfway between Madeira and the Canary Islands. But Portugal exercises sovereignty over the Savage Islands, a small archipelago north of the Canaries, claiming an EEZ border further south. Spain no longer disputes the Portuguese claim since 2015.

Romania
Area: 23,627 km2

Russia

4th largest

 Kaliningrad (Baltic Sea) – 11,634 km2
 Saint Petersburg (Baltic Sea) – 12,759 km2
 Barents Sea – 1,308,140 km2
 Black Sea (without the Crimean EEZ) – 66,854 km2
 Pacific – 3,419,202 km2
 Siberia – 3,277,292 km2
 Total – 8,095,881 km2

Senegal

Area: 158,861 km2

Somalia

Area: 825,052 km2

South Africa

South Africa's EEZ includes both that next to the African mainland and that around the Prince Edward Islands, totalling 1,535,538 km2.

 Mainland – 1,068,659 km2
 Prince Edward islands – 466,879 km2

South Korea

Area: 300,851 (225,214) km2

Spain

Area: 1,039,233 km2

Thailand

Turkey
 
Turkey's EEZ is bordered by Georgia, Russia, Ukraine, Romania and Bulgaria in the Black Sea to the north, Greece in the Aegean Sea to the west, and Cyprus and Syria in the Mediterranean Sea to the south. Turkey is one of the few countries to not have signed UNCLOS and disputes Greece's and Cyprus' EEZ.

United Kingdom

The United Kingdom has the fifth largest exclusive economic zone of  square km. It comprises the EEZs surrounding the United Kingdom, the Crown Dependencies, and the British Overseas Territories. The figure does not include the EEZ of the British Antarctic Territory.

The EEZ associated with the Falkland Islands and South Georgia are disputed by Argentina. The EEZ of the Chagos Archipelago, also known as the British Indian Ocean Territory, is also disputed with Mauritius which considers the archipelago as a part of its territory.

United States

 
The United States' exclusive economic zone is the second largest in the world, covering 11,351,000 km2. Areas of its EEZ are located in three oceans, the Gulf of Mexico, and the Caribbean Sea.

Note, the totals in the table actually add up to 12,234,403 square km and 4,723,705 square miles.

Vietnam

This figure does not include the claimed EEZ areas of the Paracel Islands and the Spratly Islands. Vietnam has disputes mainly with the People's Republic of China due to the nine-dash line.

Rankings by area

This list includes dependent territories (including uninhabited territories) within their sovereign states, but does not include various claims on Antarctica. EEZ+TIA is exclusive economic zone (EEZ) plus total internal area (TIA) which includes territorial land and internal waters.

See also

 Air defense identification zone
 Baseline
 Continental shelf
 International waters
 R v Marshall
 Special economic zone
 Territorial waters

Notes

References

Works cited:

External links

 Interactive map at MarineRegions.org, showing boundaries and disputes
 United Nations Convention on the Law of the Sea – Part V
 Sea Around Us Project – View the EEZ of all countries (note that this website does not distinguish between the territorial seas and the EEZs, therefore it tends to overstate the EEZ areas. See: EEZ AREA MEASURE)
 The USA zone since 1977
 GIS data: VLIZ.be
 Foreign Military Activities in Asian EEZs: Conflict Ahead? by Mark J. Valencia (May 2011)
 EEZ Management

 
Law of the sea
Hydrography
Fishing industry
Fisheries law